Faisalabad (Punjabi/,), previously known as Lyallpur (Punjabi, Urdu: لائل پور), named after the founder of the city, but was renamed in 1977 in honour of late King Faisal of Saudi Arabia. It is the 3rd most populous city of Pakistan after Karachi and Lahore respectively, and the 2nd largest city of Punjab after Lahore. Faisalabad is one of Pakistan's wealthiest cities, the largest industrial hub and second largest city of wider Punjab region.

Historically one of the largest villages of Punjab, Lyallpur was one of the first planned cities within British India, it has long since developed into a cosmopolitan metropolis. Faisalabad was restructured into city district status; a devolution promulgated by the 2001 local government ordinance (LGO).

Faisalabad has grown to become a major industrial and distribution centre because of its central location in the region and connecting roads, rails, and air transportation. It has been referred to as the Manchester of Pakistan".
, GDP (PPP) of Faisalabad was estimated as $43 billion and projected to rise to $87 billion in 2025 at a growth rate of 5.7%.
Faisalabad contributes over 10 percent to the Punjab's GDP and has an average annual GDP (nominal) of $20.5 billion. Agriculture and industry remain its hallmark.

Etymology 

When founded in 1890, it was named for Sir Charles James Lyall, lieutenant governor of the Punjab. It became headquarters of the Lower Chenab colony and in 1898 was incorporated as a municipality. 

In September 1977, the city of Lyallpur was renamed "Faisalabad" by the Government of Pakistan in honor of King Faisal of Saudi Arabia who had a great love for Pakistan and its people.

History

Toponymy 
The settlement was established in 1892 during the colonisation of the lower Chenab Valley. This city was settled down by Rai Bahadur Bhavanidas Sikka, because of this work British Government granted jagirs to him. After Partition his descendants settled in India. Now His fourth generations are settled in Mumbai. This city was named in honour of Lieutenant-Governor of the Punjab, Sir James Lyall, for his role in establishing the canal colonisation project. The surname Lyall was joined with the noun pur, meaning 'city' in Sanskrit.

On 1 September 1977, the Government of Pakistan changed the name of the city from Lyallpur to Faisalabad ('City of Faisal') in honour of King Faisal of Saudi Arabia, who made several financial contributions to Pakistan.

Early settlements
The region encompassing modern day Faisalabad district was originally inhabited by a number of forest-dwelling tribes. It is believed these early settlements belonged to the ancient districts of Jhang and Sandalbar, and included the area between Shahdara to Shorekot and Sangla Hill to Toba Tek Singh. The shrine of Baba Noor Shah Wali was erected in the area in the 1600s.

Development
At the conclusion of the Second Anglo-Sikh War in 1849, the entire Punjab region became administered as Punjab province, firstly by the East India Company and after 1858 as part of the British Raj.

In the 1880s the Punjab government began an irrigation scheme to cultivate large tracts of western Punjab through the creation of canal colonies. The Chenab colony was the largest of these colonisation projects, and covered the entirety of present-day Faisalabad district. Popham Young, the Colonisation Officer managing the project identified the site of the current city to establish headquarters for the colony.

Young designed the settlement's centre to replicate the design in the Union Jack with eight roads extending from a large clock tower at its epicentre; a design geometrically symbolic of the Cross of Saint Andrew counterchanged with the Cross of Saint Patrick, and Saint George's Cross over all. The eight roads developed into eight separate bazaars (markets) leading to different regions of the Punjab. In 1892, the newly constructed town with its growing agricultural surplus was added to the British rail network. Construction of the rail link between Wazirabad and Lyallpur was completed in 1895. In 1896, Gujranwala, Jhang and Sahiwal comprising the Tehsils of Lyallpur were under the administrative control of the Jhang District. The town became one of the first planned settlements within British India.

In 1904, the new district of Lyallpur was created to include the tehsils of Samundri and Toba Tek Singh with a sub-tehsil at Jaranwala, which later became a full tehsil in itself. The University of Agriculture, originally the Punjab Agricultural College and Research Institute, Lyallpur, was established in 1906. The Town Committee was upgraded to a Municipal Committee in 1909. Lyallpur grew into an established agricultural tool and grain centre. By 1911 the city had a population of 19,578. The 1930s brought industrial growth and market expansion to the textile industry as well as to food processing, grain crushing and chemicals.

Independence 
In August 1947, following three decades of nationalist struggles, India and Pakistan achieved independence. The British agreed to partition British India into two sovereign states – Pakistan with a Muslim majority, and India with a Hindu majority; however, more Muslims remained in India than what governing authorities believed would assimilate into Pakistan. The partitioning led to a mass migration of an estimated 10 million people which made it the largest mass migration in human history. The Punjab province was divided into Punjab, West Pakistan and Punjab, India.  There were also respective divisions of the British Indian Army, the Indian Civil Service, various administrative services, the central treasury, and the railways. Riots and local fighting followed the expeditious withdrawal of the British, resulting in an estimated one million civilians deaths, particularly in the western region of Punjab. Lyallpur, which was located in the region of the Punjab Province that became West Pakistan, was populated by a minority of Hindus and Sikhs who migrated to India, while Muslim refugees from East Punjab settled in the district.

In 1977, Pakistani authorities changed the name of the city from Lyallpur to Faisalabad, in order to honor the close friendship of King Faisal of Saudi Arabia with Pakistan. 

During the eighties, the city saw an influx of foreign investments in the texile sector. Large number of residents of Faisalabad began working abroad as bilateral ties improved as part of new trade agreements. This led to more foreign remittances into the city. This aided the development of large scale infrastructure projects within the city. In 1985, the city was upgraded as a division with the districts of Faisalabad, Jhang and Toba Tek Singh.

Geography

Location 
The lower Chenab canal provides water to 80% of cultivated lands making it the main source of irrigation. Faisalabad is bound on the north by Chiniot and Sheikhupura, on the east by Sheikhupura and Sahiwal, on the south by Sahiwal and Toba Tek Singh and on the west by Jhang.

Geology 
The district of Faisalabad is part of the alluvial plains between the Himalayan foothills and the central core of the Indian subcontinent. The alluvial deposits are typically over a thousand feet thick. The interfluves are believed to have been formed during the Late Pleistocene and feature river terraces. These were later identified as old and young floodplains of the Ravi River on the Kamalia and Chenab Plains. The old floodplains consist of Holocene deposits from the Ravi and Chenab rivers.

The soil consists of young stratified silt loam or very fine sand loam which makes the subsoil weak in structure with common kankers at only five feet. The course of the rivers within Faisalabad are winding and often subject to frequent alternations. In the rainy season, the currents are very strong. This leads to high floods in certain areas which do last for a number of days. The Rakh and Gogera canals have encouraged the water levels in the district however the belt on the Ravi River has remained narrow. The river bed does include the river channels which have shifted the sand bars and low sandy levees leading to river erosion.
Faisalabad is situated at the centre of the lower Rechna Doab, the area is located between the Chenab and Ravi rivers. The topography is marked by valleys, local depression and high ground.

Climate 

The weather in the city is monitored by the Pakistan Meteorological Department. The Pakistan Meteorological Department regularly provides forecasts, public warnings and rainfall information to farmers with the assistance of the National Agromet Centre.

It is at its peak in July and August during monsoon season though western disturbances during winter months also bring considerable rainfall associated with hail. Monsoon season which starts in July and ends in September brings heavy rain to the city causing flash flooding. If the monsoon currents interact with the western disturbance, then cloudburst can also occur. July is the wettest month of the year during which flooding is reported number of times. Monsoon ends in September and then the dry period begins. October and November are the driest months with very little rainfall. During winter the weather usually remains cloudy associated with frequent fog. The temperature of the city has reached a summer maximum record temperature of 48.0 °C (118.4 °F), which was observed on 9 June 1947 and again on 26 May 2010. An extreme minimum temperature of −4.0 °C (24.8 °F) was recorded on 15 January 1978. The highest wind gust ever recorded in Faisalabad occurred during a severe dust-thunderstorm on 2 June 2000, when the maximum wind speed reached 151 kilometers per hour (94 mph). Apart from temperature and rainfall records, the winds in Faisalabad are generally light. The city lies in an area with low wind speeds. Westerly breeze dominates the afternoons, while the nights are calm. Southeast / easterly winds are common here during the monsoon season. Faisalabad, being in the plains, can experience severe thunderstorms and high wind gusts that can be damaging to its crops.

Culture 

Faisalabad, the third most populated metropolis in Pakistan after Karachi and Lahore is an epicentre for trade that has gained popularity for its colonial heritage sites. In 1982, the Government of Punjab established the Faisalabad Arts Council, a division of the Punjab Arts Council which is overseen administratively by the Information, Culture and Youth Affairs Department. The Faisalabad Arts Council building, designed by architect Nayyer Ali Dada, was completed in 2006.  The auditorium was named after the late Nusrat Fateh Ali Khan, a Pakistani musician and singer.

Festivals 
The Punjabi people celebrate a variety of cultural and religious festivals throughout the Punjab region, such as arts and craft, music, local events, and religious celebrations. The city of Faisalabad customarily celebrates its independence day on 14 August every year by raising the Pakistan flag at the clock tower in the Commissioner Office compound. Bazaars are colourfully decorated for the celebration, government and private buildings are brightly lit, and there are similar flag–raising ceremonies that are typically held in the district and its tehsils.

The arrival of spring brings the annual "Rang-e-Bahar" festival where the Parks & Horticulture Authority of the city district government organise a flower show and exhibition at Jinnah Gardens. The University of Agriculture organises a similar event at their main campus which is known as the "Kissan Mela". The festival of Basant which involves kite flying is an annual tradition in the city despite the ban. The provincial government introduced the "Canal Mela" which involves five days of festivities including the main canal in the city being decorated with national floats and lights ending with a musical concert to conclude the festival.

Being a Muslim majority the city religious observances include Ramadan and Muharram. The festivals of Chaand Raat, Eid al-Fitr and Eid al-Adha are celebrated and are national holidays. The celebration of the Prophet Muhammad birthday is observed in the city which is often referred to as "Eid Milād-un-Nabī". There are a number of darbar and shrines which attract a number of devotees during the annual Urs. There are a number of Christian churches in the city where Easter and Christmas services take place each year.

Attire 
Traditional attire in Faisalabad is Punjabi clothing such as the Kurta and Sherwanis. Faisalabadi men wear white shalwar kameez as do women but also with a dupatta (scarf). The more religious women wear burqas that may or may not cover the face. Combinations of Pakistani and Western attire are worn by women, such as an embroidered kurta worn with jeans or trousers, and half sleeve or sleeveless shirts with Capri pants. Men and women have adopted some of the modern Western styles for both casual and formal business dress such as dress pants, trousers, T-shirts and jeans.

Faisalabad Institute of Textile and Fashion Design at the Government College University teaches Fashion Design as part of their Fine Arts program. Some of the more conservative establishments and universities follow strict dress codes, such as the National Textile University in Faisalabad where a notice was issued on 27 April 2016 by university professor Muhammad Ashfaq. The intent of the notice was to "promote a positive image of the NTU and to maintain good moral, religious and cultural values among the faculty, staff and students."  The dress code bans certain styles of Western attire including shorts, sleeveless shirts and shawls for men.  Women are prohibited from wearing jeans, tights or leggings, sleeveless or half-sleeved shirts for women.  Women are also prohibited from wearing heavy make-up and expensive jewellery.

Cuisine 
Faisalabadi cuisine is a mixture Punjabi cuisine as well as Mughlai cuisine and Anglo-Indian cuisine. Famous dishes include rice or roti (flatbread) served with a vegetable or non-vegetable curry, a salad consisting of spiced tomatoes and onions, and yogurt. This is usually accompanied by a variety of South Asian sweets such as gud, gajar ka halwa, gulab jamun, and jalebi. Tandoori barbecue specialties consist of a variety of naan bread served with tandoori chicken, chicken tikka or lamb shishkebab served with a mint chutney.

Street foods are a key element to Faisalabadi cuisine. Samosas (deep fried pastry filled with vegetables or meat) topped with an onion salad and two types of chutney. There is even a square dedicated to them in the old city. Other street foods include, dahi bhale (deep fried vadas in creamy yoghurt), gol gappay (fried round puri filled with vegetables and topped with tamarind chutney) and vegetable or chicken pakoras. Biryani and murgh pilao rice are a speciality in Faisalabad.

A typical breakfast in Faislabadi is halwa poori, consisting of a deep fried flatbread served with a spicy chickpea curry and sweet orange coloured halwa. It is customarily accompanied by a sweet or salty yoghurt based drink called lassi. During winter, a common breakfast is roghni naan served with paya.

Certain drinks are available seasonally, such as, such as rabri doodh, a drink commonly made with full-fat milk, almonds, pistachios and basil seeds, dhood patti (milky tea), and Kashmiri chai, a pink coloured milky tea containing almonds and pistachios, which is had in the winters. During summer, drinks such as sugar cane juice, nimbu pani (iced lemon water), skanjvi (iced orange and black pepper) and lassi are consumed.

There are American fast food franchises that cater to the local community, such as McDonald's, Kentucky Fried Chicken (KFC), and Pizza Hut.

Literacy 
According to a report by the United Nations Educational, Scientific and Cultural Organization (UNESCO), the 2015 literacy rate for Pakistan ranked 160th which is among the lowest literacy rates in the world.

In 1981, Faisalabad was among four districts in Punjab, which included Gujranwala, Jhelum and Gujrat, that were experiencing low literacy rates, due primarily to either a lack of resources or family pressure; the latter of which may also be attributable to illiteracy. In 1998, Faisalabad progressed to a higher literacy rate with the most improvement realised at the primary school level. In 2008, Faisalabad District ranked 51.9% which placed the district ninth in literacy out of the 34 Punjab districts.

In 2014, the city held its first literary festival which brought a number of writers to the city to encourage the community to follow the arts. Two literary groups were established, the Faisalabad Union of Column Writers and Faisalabad Union of Journalists, to bring together printed media personalities for the purpose of providing training to budding writers from the city.

Notable people
Many famous and notable people were either born or lived in Faisalabad, some of them are;

 Freedom fighters Rai Ahmad Khan Kharal and Bhagat Singh
 Master Sunder Singh Lyallpuri, Indian independence movement leader, educationist and journalist
 Grahanandan Singh, field hockey player 
 Shahbaz Ahmed, field hockey player 
 Cricketers Rameez Raja, Aqeel Ahmed, Saeed Ajmal, Naeem Akhtar, Shahid Nazir, Wasim Haider, Mohammad Talha, Misbah-ul-Haq and Asif Ali
 Snooker player Muhammad Asif
 Scientist Nitya Anand 
 Iqrar Ahmad Khan, agricultural scientist
 Famous playback singer Mala 
 Fateh Ali Khan, famous Qawwali singer
 Famous Qawali singers Nusrat Fateh Ali Khan and Rahat Fateh Ali Khan
 Famous singer, politician and philanthropist Abrar-ul-Haq
 Famous singer Karnail Gil
 Jassi Lailpuria, a Punjabi singer of pop and bhangra music
 Famous singer Amanat Ali 
 Swarn Noora, Punjabi Sufi singer
 Lal Chand Yamla Jatt, famous Punjabi folk singer
 Naqsh Lyallpuri, pen name of Jaswant Rai Sharma, Indian ghazal and Bollywood film lyricist
 Well-known Punjabi language writer and poet, Hari Singh Dilbar
 Ifti Nasim, poet
 Naz Khialvi, lyricist, poet and radio broadcaster
 Gurcharan Das author, spokesperson, columnist, writer, CEO of Pundit & Intellectual
 Khalid Maqbool, lieutenant general and politician
 Arjan Singh marshal and only officer of the Indian Air Force to be promoted to five-star rank, recipient of Padma Bhushan and Padma Shri
 Arfa Karim, famous computer prodigy
 Social activist Teji Bachchan
 The legendary actor Prithviraj Kapoor
 Zia Mohyeddin, artist, actor
 Resham, famous film actress
 Tariq Teddy, television actor and stand-up comedian
 Nabeel Zafar, television actor and producer 
 Sakhawat Naz, television actor and stand-up comedian
 Barkat Ali Ludhianwi, a Sufi and founder of the non-political, non-profit, religious organisation, Dar-ul-Ehsan
 Rufin Anthony, Roman Catholic priest and bishop 
 John Joseph, Roman Catholic priest and bishop

Demographics 

The language of Faisalabad is Punjabi predominantly 96%, Urdu and Pashto are spoken by 2% population each. Faisalabad is world's second largest Punjabi speaking city.
It was initially designed to accommodate 20,000 people. The city's population increased from 69,930 in 1941 to 179,000 in 1951 (152.2% increase). Much of the increase is attributed to the settlement of Muslim refugees from East Punjab and Haryana, India. In 1961, the population rose to 425,248, an increase of 137.4%. Faisalabad set a record in the demographic history of Pakistan by registering an overall population increase of 508.1% between 1941 and 1961. The industrial revolution of the 1960s contributed to population growth. In 1961, the population was 425,248. A 1972 census ranked Faisalabad as the third largest city of Pakistan with a population of 864,000. In a 1981 census, the population was 1,092,000; however, the Faisalabad Development Authority estimated the number to be 1,232,000. In the 2017 consensus, the total population of the city was 3,203,846

Religion and ethnic groups 

The province of Punjab, in which Faisalabad is the second largest city, has prevalent sociocultural distinctions. Population sizes vary by district but some distinguishing factors include a young age structure, high age dependency ratio, a higher percentage of males, a higher proportion of married population, and heterogeneity in tribes and languages.

Islam is the most common religion, with a 97.22% Muslim majority according to the 1998 Pakistan census report and 2001 population data sheet. People live in tight-knit joint families, although a nuclear family system is emerging due to changing socio-economic conditions. Ancient culture prevails in most marriage practices in the region, as do certain restrictions related to ethnicity and tribes. However, the influences of more modern societies have effected some change, particularly in the area of the dowry system. In the following ancient culture, marriages are customarily arranged by the parents or matchmakers. In some instances, the husband must buy his wife from her parents. Studies conducted in 2007 and 2013, the latter in an outlying rural village in Faisalabad District, acknowledged the existence of gender bias and discrimination against females, stating that "Gender discrimination is not a new phenomenon", and that it still exists in the modern world.

Social change in the region has been a slow process but there are indications that change has occurred as more villages are exposed to various forms of media and modernized urban communities. In early 2014, there was a march known as the "White Ribbon Campaign" which took place in front of the Faisalabad Press Club. Protestors appealed to the government to adopt new laws "to protect women who are discriminated against in the family and workplace."

Prevalent minorities, particularly Hindu and Christian, feel a sense of vulnerability because of their religious beliefs. Labourers and farmhands form the countless Christian villages throughout Punjab; many are descendants of people who converted from Hinduism to Christianity under the British Raj, and considered low caste by virtue of their birth. A small population of wealthy, well-educated Christians have settled in Karachi; however, as a result of increasing Islamization, religious intolerance in Pakistani society, blasphemy laws and Islamist militancy, most have left Pakistan to settle in other countries where there is more religious tolerance, such as Canada and Australia.

Economy

As of 2015 GDP (PPP) of Faisalabad was estimated at $63 billion and projected to rise to $107 billion in 2025 at a growth rate of 5.7%.

Faisalabad contributes over 35% toward Pakistan's annual GDP and export revenue. The textile and apparel industry is the major industry in Faisalabad. It is also responsible for almost 60-80% of the export revenue of Pakistan.

The Faisalabad Chamber of Commerce and Industry (FCCI) and Pakistan Hosiery Manufacturers Association (PHMA) are the regulatory bodies for all textile and apparel manufacturers in the city. These organizations work closely with the Ministry of Trade. 

Faisalabad is as an industrial center with industries like  processing mills, engineering, industrial goods, textile manufacturing including cotton and silk textiles, super phosphates, apparel and hosiery, industrial chemicals and dyes, pulp and paper, agricultural research and equipment, oil and ghee (clarified butter), and concentrated beverages.

Ghanta Ghar 
The Faisalabad clock tower and its eight bazaars (markets) is a major trading zone in the city. The eight markets were designed based on the English flag, Union Jack. Every one of the eight bazaars is known for certain goods. 

 Katchery Bazar is known for its mobile phones and accessories market. It is named for the session courts located adjacent to the street
 Rail Bazar is famous for its gold and cloth market.
 Kharkhana Bazaar is known for its spices and herbs.
 Montgomery Bazaar (also known as Sutar Mandi) is known for yarn and raw cloth trading.
 Jhang Bazaar is known for its fish, meat, vegetables and fruits.
 Bhawana Bazaar has all the commercial and industrial electrical goods.
 Aminpur Bazaar has some of the oldest books, stationery and interior décor boutiques.
 Chiniot Bazaar is known for allopathic and homoeopathic medicinal stores.

Industrial zones 
Faisalabad Industrial Estate Developement & Management Company (FIEDMC) was established by Federal Government to boost manufacturing in Faisalabad. Its objectives are to promote business and develop new clientele for the city's factories. It further supports businesses to find suitable land, infrastructure, provision of utilities and dedicated business support services. 

Value Addition City (VAC) commonly known as Garment city is located at Sahianwala Road, near Khurrianwala. It is home to many garments and apparel factories.

M-3 Industrial City (M-3-IC) comprises 4356 acres of land and Allama Iqbal City (AllC) comprises more than 3300 acres. They house large scale manufacturing companies including textiles, yarn mills, pharmaceuticals, chemicals automotive, and spare parts, etc.

Small Industrial Estate (SME) located at Punj Pullian Road houses small to medium sized industries. It was provided by former Prime Minister, Mian Muhammad Nawaz Sharif to provide international grade services to small and medium sized companies at promotional packages.

Faisalabad has received substantial funding from the government of Punjab and the city district government to improve infrastructure and roads to rural areas. In an effort to deal with the energy crisis, the FCCI has been working with private companies to develop renewable energy resources such as solar energy and the construction of dams within the district. CAE, a German-based renewable energy company, has disclosed plans to establish the first solar panel manufacturing facility in Faisalabad, second of its kind in Asia, with intentions of investing upwards of €100 million (Rs 12.9 billion) for its development.

2020 Covid-19 Pandemic 

Pakistan entered a complete lockdown on the 20th of March 2020. All national and international travel was suspended. The industry in Faisalabad was hit hard. The federal government ordered complete closure of all industrial units.

Some industrial units are screening their workers for the coronavirus and making sure they follow the SOPs issued by the government as well. Punjab has reported more than 11,000 coronavirus cases so far.

2022 Floods Impact 

Pakistan saw a record flooding in the western and southern part of the country during the monsoon season in 2022. This resulted in a massive food shortage and provision of industrial raw materials such as cotton. Faisalabad's textile industry took a massive hit in the costs and availability of cotton.

Education 

Faisalabad has several research and educational institutions. Faisalabad is considered a regional hub for of research and higher education, specializing in agriculture, medical sciences, chemical sciences, textile universities and economics.  

There are many public funded institutions that offer scholarships and financing options to lower and middle income households. Many private schools, colleges and universities offer huge range of courses at various levels of education.

Education system 
The education system is administered by the chief executive officer (CEO) of the District Education Authority of Faisalabad. The city district Government is responsible for funding, finances, management and resource allocation for public run institutions.
It falls under the Ministry of Federal Education and Professional Training and the Minister for Education.

High ranking institutions 

Public funded
  Divisional Public School Faisalabad
 Divisional Model School & College, Faisalabad
  University of Agriculture
  Government College University
  Nuclear Institute for Agriculture and Biology
  Government College for Women University
  University of Engineering & Technology of Lahore

Private funded
  National Textile University
 National University of Modern Languages (NUML)
 NFC Institute of Engineering and Fertilizer Research (NFC-IEFR)
  University of Faisalabad
  The Millennium Universal College Faisalabad Campus (TMUC Faisalabad)
 Beaconhouse School System
 The City School
 Roots Ivy School
 Allied School
 Punjab Group of Colleges
 SKANS School of Accountancy

Government and Administration

Civic Administration 
Faisalabad was restructured into city district status; a devolution promulgated by the 2001 local government ordinance (LGO). It is governed by the city district's seven departments: Agriculture, Community Development, Education, Finance and Planning, Health, Municipal Services, and Works and Services. The district coordination officer of Faisalabad (DCO) is head of the city district government and responsible for co-ordinating and supervising the administrative units. Each of the seven departments has its own Executive District Officer who is charged with co-ordinating and overseeing the activities of their respective departments.

The aim of the city district government is to empower politics by improving governance which basically involved decentralising administrative authority with the establishment of different departments and respective department heads, all working under one platform.  The stated vision and mission of the city district government of Faisalabad is to "establish an efficient, effective and accountable city district government, which is committed to respecting and upholding women, men and children's basic human rights, responsive towards people's needs, committed to poverty reduction and capable of meeting the challenges of the 21st century. Our actions will be driven by the concerns of local people."

Tehsil Municipal Administration 
In 2005, Faisalabad was reorganised as a city district composed of eight Tehsil municipal administrations (TMAs) or towns as follows: Lyallpur, Madina, Jinnah, Iqbal, Chak Jhumra, Jaranwala,  Samundari, and Tandlianwala. The functions of the TMA include preparation of the spatial and land use plans, management of these development plans and exercise of control over land use, land sub-division, land development and zoning by public and private sectors, enforcement of municipal laws, rules and by-laws, provision and management of water, drainage waste and sanitation along with allied municipal services.

There are 118 union councils in Faisalabad. Their role is to collect and maintain statistical information for socio-economic surveys. They consolidate ward neighbourhood development needs and prioritise these into union-wide development proposals. The council identifies any deficiencies in the delivery of these services and makes recommendations for improvement to the TMA.

Faisalabad Development Authority 
The Faisalabad Development Authority (FDA) was validly established in October 1976 under The Punjab Development of Cities Act (1976) to regulate, supervise and implement development activities in its jurisdiction area. The FDA acts as a policy-making body for the development of the city and is in charge of arranging and supervising major developments within the city. It is responsible for the administration of building regulations, management of parks and gardens and subsoil water management. The FDA works with the Water and Sanitation Agency (WASA) to control and maintain the water supply, sewerage and drainage. The FDA works to improve conditions in the slums.

Public Services

Law enforcement

Punjab Police

Law enforcement in Faisalabad is carried out by provincial police force officially called Punjab Police. Within the city of Faisalabad, it is under the command of the city police officer (CPO), an appointment by the provincial government appointments for Punjab Police. The office of the CPO is located in the District Courts, Faisalabad. 

Faisalabad Region is headed by an officer not less than the rank of Deputy Inspector-General of Police (DIG). Faisalabad Police is headed by a District Police Officer who is assisted by a varying number of Superintendents and Deputy Superintendents of Police.

City Traffic Police Faisalabad

City Traffic Police is a branch of Punjab Police which is a public funded entity of the provincial government of Punjab. 

The department is responsible for maintaining the following within the district of Faisalabad:
 Conduct traffic safety and compliance
 Traffic signs
 Road signs and closures
 Road marking and planning
 Traffic signals and maintaining uninterrupted flow of traffic
 Traffic violation ticketing and penalty collection
 Issuance of driving license
 Conducting driving tests and provisional licensing

District and Session Courts Faisalabad

District and Sessions Court in Faisalabad is an extension of the provincial bench of High Court in Lahore. 

The offices are located at District Courts Faisalabad.. Directions can also be found at Google Maps for Sessions Courts Faisalabad and District Courts Faisalabad.

Special Offices

Police formations including District Police, Elite Police, Punjab highway Patrol, Crime Investigation Branch, and Special Operations Branch have offices in the city.

Taxation 

Regional Tax Office is a field formation of the Federal Board of Revenue (FBR). It is situated at Regional Tax Office, Jail Road, Faisalabad and can be found at Google Maps Regional Tax Office. 

This office is responsible for monitoring and collection of federal taxes imposed by the Government of Pakistan. This office has jurisdiction to send notices, research and execute legal notices for entities operating within the district of Faisalabad. 

This office actively runs mass media campaigns to create awareness regarding taxation, legal rights of citizens and to facilitate voluntary tax compliances. 

This office can provide information regarding Income Tax, Sales Tax (VAT), Corporation Tax and Zero-Tax rated services.

The website managed and operated by the FBR, is a reliable and up-to-date source of information for all tax related matters. FBR does issue regular notices to ensure correct information is published and to disregard false information circulating in the market places by unverified sources.

Excise, Taxation and Narcotics Control Department is another department managed by the provincial Govt. of Punjab. This department is responsible for the following:

 Collection of property tax
 Issuance of property notices, and property taxes
 Motor vehicle registration
 Online verification of registered vehicles
 Online self assessment of property tax
 Motor vehicle clearance 
 Control of regulated substances and prosecutions

The department can be accessed by its website ETNC. The office can be accessed by the Google Maps ETNC.

Water and Sanitation 

The Water and Sanitation Agency (WASA) is a subsidiary of Faisalabad Development Authority (FDA), established on 23 April 1978 under the Development of Cities Act 1976. Estimates in indicate that the WASA provides about 72% of the city's sewerage services and about 60% of their water services. From the wells, water is pumped to a terminal reservoir located on Sargodha Road. Water is normally supplied for a total of about 8 hours per day to the majority of the city. The Japan International Cooperation Agency (JICA) has provided financial and hardware equipment to help improve the water and sanitation conditions in the city.

Healthcare

Government Hospitals 
Faisalabad is home to some large public hospitals within the district. Allied Hospital Faisalabad is the largest public funded and managed hospital within the city of Faisalabad as well as the district. It offers many advanced treatments and specialist care facilities.

Other notable government–run hospitals are DHQ (District Head Quarter) Hospital, Institute of Child Care, PINUM Cancer Hospital, Govt. Children Hospital, Punjab Social Security Hospital, Social Security Newborn and Children Hospital, Punjab Employees Maternity Ward, and Faisalabad Institute of Cardiology. 

There are other government funded and managed general hospitals in Ghulam Muhammadabad, Samanabad and Peoples Colony No. 2.

Media

Television and radio 
The Pakistan Electronic Media Regulatory Authority (PEMRA) is responsible for the regulation and monitoring of electronic media entertainment in the country. Pakistan Television Corporation, is the state-owned regulated television broadcasting network. The government began licensing private broadcasters in 2002.

The government of Pakistan installed the first radio transmitters in the city on 15 September 1982. "Radio Pakistan" broadcasts three government regulated FM stations: "Radio Pakistan FM101, Radio Pakistan FM93 and Radio Pakistan Sautul Qur'an Channel FM93.4.  FM101 became operational in 2002, FM93 went live in 2010 and FM93.4 Sautul Qur'an Channel went live in 2016; PBC all three stations are standard power KW 2.5.

Telecommunications 
Pakistan Telecommunication Authority is a government-owned organisation that is responsible for the establishment, operation and maintenance of telecommunications in the city. The organisation monitors and prevents illegal exchanges in the city.

Pakistan Telecommunication Company Limited is the main provider of fixed line, mobile and broadband services. Regional headquarters is located at the Central Telecom House in Chinot Bazaar. With the deregulation of the telecommunication sector by the Ministry of Information Technology, a range of companies now offer mobile and broadband services in the city.

Film and theatre 
In 2008, the Government of Pakistan lifted a forty-year ban on Bollywood films which allowed Indian films to be played in cinemas. The cinema industry has since seen the introduction of new cinemas such as Cinepax by Hotel One, and Cine Nagina.

The Government College University in Faisalabad encourages students from the University of Agriculture to hold workshops and explore themes of peace and tolerance which can be used in an engaging and entertaining way to communicate complex issues to different audiences.

Recreation

Social clubs 
The Chenab Club, founded in 1910 is the oldest social club in Faisalabad. It was founded by the British armed forces serving in the area, during the British rule. Today it is a prestigious club offering sports, recreation, dining and cultural activities.

Public parks 
The Parks and Horticulture Authority (PHA) is responsible for running and managing all public parks within the district of Faisalabad. 

Jinnah Gardens is the oldest and most established public park in the city. It serves as the city's central park, and a cultural hub. It is commonly known as "Company Bagh". A monument of Sir James Broadwood Lyall is situated at the eastern corner of the park. 

Dhobi Ghat Park is a historic park, in the oldest part of the city. It is located on Kotwali Road, just next to the Government College University, Faisalabad. The park has a long history of rallies and protests. The park was chosen as a venue of choice by Muhammad Ali Jinnah, Liaqat Ali Khan, Huseyn Shaheed Suhrawardy,  Zulfiqar Ali Bhutto, Benazir Bhutto, Nawaz Sharif, Shebaz Sharif, Maryam Nawaz and Imran Khan.

Gatwala Park is located in the outskirts of the city, on the north-eastern side. It serves as a family park with amusements such as a zoo and a lake. The Gatwala Wildlife Park is a botanical natural reserve located next to the Gatwala Park. It that was renovated by the city district government. 

Pahari Grounds is located in Peoples Colony #2. It is a residential area popular locations such as Babar Chowk, Fawara Chowk and the old gates. A Pakistan Air Force retired F-86 Sabre is on display on a hilltop within this park. It is a local attraction.

D-Ground Park is located in the Peoples Colony #1 area, within the D-Ground shopping area. Several models of Pakistani monuments are on display in this park, all year round.

Sports 

Cricket is a popular sport in Faisalabad.  Regional and international cricket matches are held in Iqbal Stadium, named after Pakistani poet Sir Allama Muhammad Iqbal. The stadium is home to Faisalabad's local team, the Faisalabad Wolves. Iqbal Stadium hosted the 1987 Cricket World Cup, and the 1996 Cricket World Cup.

The Faisalabad Hockey Stadium, located on Susan Road, was constructed in 2002, and can accommodate 25,000 spectators.  On 16 April 2003, the stadium was inaugurated by Khalid Maqbool, governor of Punjab.  It is the third-largest field hockey stadium in the country. The stadium has hosted field hockey matches for both national and international competition but by the beginning of 2016 was reported to be in "pathetic condition as its astroturf has completed its life span about eight years ago." Commissioner Naseem Nawaz advised that efforts were under way to maintain the stadium.

In October 2002, the Government College University established a Directorate of Sports to promote university and national level sports for male and female players.  Infrastructure and facilities are available for university players in track, hockey, tennis, basketball, table tennis, badminton and cricket pitch.

Public libraries and museums 
There are two libraries that are open to the public: Allama Iqbal Library and Municipal Corporation Public Library. They are funded and regulated by the government of Punjab under the service sector.
 Allama Iqbal Library is located on University Road, opposite the District Courts. The library is housed in the 1911-built colonial building originally named "Coronation Library" during the rule of the British Empire. In 2012, the building came under control of the Lyallpur Heritage Foundation and the Punjab Archives and Libraries Department.
 Lyallpur Museum is located adjacent to the Allama Iqbal Library on University Road. It is a heritage museum and art gallery open to the public. The museum is primarily focused on regional history with a collection of artwork, artefacts and photographs.
 Municipal Library is located in Iqbal Park on Narwala Road, opposite the historical grounds of Dhobi Ghat. The library has a large collection of books, a photo gallery and a conference centre. In 2011, the library underwent a renovation costing 40 million rupees.
 The Forest Library at the Punjab Forestry Research Institute (PFRI) is one of two specialist libraries, the other being in Lahore. Opened in 1986, the research library is based at the Wildlife Research Center in Gatwala.

Sister cities
Faisalabad is a globally recognized city due to its textiles export trade. Its sister cities are:

 Qingdao, China
 Wuhan, China
 Tabriz, Iran
 Kanpur, India
 Kobe, Japan
 Cordoba, Spain
 Sharjah, United Arab Emirates
 Manchester, United Kingdom
 Los Angeles, United States of America

Transport 

Faisalabad is located in the central area of the province of Punjab and also within the national territory of Pakistan. It is well-connected by railways, road network, air and dry port.

Aviation 

It is located at Faisalabad-Jhang Road. The airport underwent major renovations during between 2014 and 2017. The main termainal building was compeleted renovated. Major extensions were carried out as part of a major development initiative by the former Prime Minister of Pakistan, Mian Muhammad Nawaz Sharif. 

It is a regional airport that serves domestic and international travel. The airport offers cargo, freight, passenger travel, private terminal, flying school, and military base to Pakistan Air Force.

The airlines with operations at Faisalabad International Airport include Pakistan International Airlines, FlyDubai, Qatar Airways, Air Arabia, Gulf Air and Serene Air.

Public transport 

Faisalabad is primarily a car centric city. Public transport is available but not regulated.

Taxis, tuktuk and rickshaws 

Yellow taxis are available at the airport, railway station and bus station. They are hardly available at any other venue. They are basic vehicles and are not comparable to first world taxis.

Tuktuk and rickshaws are the most common mode of public transport. They are economical and widely available. They carry a capacity from 1 to 7 passengers. They are quite expert at navigation and can use shortcuts within the city.

Private hire, car and van rentals 

There are many private car and van rental vendors available in the city. They can be booked at the airport or by your local hotel. There are options for a driver or self-drive. Pakistani driving license or an international driving license is acceptable. 

International car rental companies have no presence in the country. Travelers have to rely on friends and family, or private rentals.

Buses and coaches 

There are many private intercity bus operators in the city. You can find seats to most major destinations within the country within minutes of arriving at the bus station. During peak seasons it is advised to book in advance. Faisalabad Central Bus Station located next to the Faisalabad Railway Station is the largest bus stand in the city.

Daewoo Pakistan is the largest operator of private bus services within Pakistan. They operate out of their private bus terminal located at Punj Pullian Road. They provide passenger transport, cargo transport and mail forwarding services.

Local commute 

Bus transportation is provided by the Regional Transport Authority (RTA) Faisalabad. Faisalabad's local bus network started as a series of several numbered feeder routes, but only three of these routes remain operational. 

These routes are numbered as B-10, B-11, and W-20. Due to poor management by the public transportation services, private wagons and rickshaw operators make up a larger proportion of the transportation network than public bus routes.

In 1994, Faisalabad Urban Transport System Service (FUTS) launched 14-19 passenger Toyota Hiace vans throughout the city. Overtime, due to lack of proper maintenance they started appearing less and less on the roads. Today, they are nowhere to be seen.

Road network 

Faisalabad has a highly developed road network. There are many access ways in and out of the city. It is well connected through motorways, dual-carriageways and highways.

Motorways 

Motoways were introduced in Pakistan in 1996 under the former Prime Minister of Pakistan, Mian Muhammad Nawaz Sharif. They were designed to reduce congestion, boost trade, and reduce travel times across cities.

Motorway M-4 passes the city at its north-western and south-western sides. It is an access  controlled 4-lane motorway. It can be accessed through the Sahianwala Interchange Exit 3, Deputywala Interchange Exit 4, Faisalabad City Interchange Exit 5, Aminpur Interchange Exit 6. 

Motorway M-3 passes the city at its north-eastern and south-eastern sides. It is an access controlled 6-lane motorway. It can be accessed through Jaranwala Interchange Exit 4 and Samundri Interchange Exit 5.

Expressways 

Faisalabad Canal Expressway project was initiated by the former Prime Minister of Pakistan, Mian Muhammad Nawaz Sharif and Federal Minister, Rana Sanaullah Khan in 2014. The expressway links the city with Sahianwala Interchange Exit 3, on M-4 Motorway. It passes through Sahianwala, Chak Jhumra, Lahore-Sheikhupura Dual-carriageway, Kashmir Underpass, Abdullahpur Underpass, and Nusrat Fateh Ali Khan Underpass. It is a 6-lane no toll asphalt road and provides signal free access.

Samundri Expressway project was planned and developed in 2016. It is an extension of the Faisalabad Canal Expressway and plans to upgrade the existing Samundri Road into an expressway. The project is still in process and minor progress can be seen. The project was halted when former Prime Minister of Pakistan, Mian Muhammad Nawaz Sharif was ousted in 2018.

Single/dual carriage highways 

Faisalabad-Sheikhupura-Lahore Road is a dual carriage highway and serves a major industrial zone in the city. It is unofficially referred to as Grand Trunk Highway (GT Road). It originates at Sargodha Road. It passes through Gatwala, Khurrianwala, Shahkot, Manawala, Sheikhupura and Lahore.

Faisalabad-Sargodha Road is a dual carriage highway till the city of Chiniot. It continues as a single-carriage highway passing through Chenab Nagar, Ahmad Nagar, Lalian and Sargodha.

Narwala Road is a dual-carriage highway till the Aminpur Interchange at M-4 Motorway. It continues as a single-carriage highway, passing through Narwala Bangla, Aminupur Bangla and Bhawana.

Faisalabad-Jhang Road is a dual-carriage highway. It is popular as the access point for Faisalabad International Airport. It passes through Painsra on-route to Jhang.

Faisalabad-Samundri Road is a dual-carriage highway. It passes through Dijkot on-route to Samundri. It is the access route to Samundri Interchange Exit 5 on M-3 Motorway.

Faisalabad-Satiana Road is a dual-carriage highway. It passes through Rao Khanuana and Satiana on-route to Tandlianwala.

Faisalabad-Jaranwala Road is a dual-carriage highway. It passes through Makkuana, Jaranwala, Bucheki, More Khunda, Sharaqpur, Burj Attari and Shahdara. It is the access route to Jaranwala Interchange Exit 4 on M-3 Motorway.

Main arteries 

The city is well developed as compared to other cities in Pakistan. The major arteries of the cities are asphalt paved and traffic controlled by the city traffic police department. Here is a list of major roads within the city.

 Main Boulevard
 Satiana Road
 D-Ground
 Chenone Road
 Kohinoor Road
 Jaranwala Road
 Susan Road
 Sangla Hill Road
 Samundri Road
 Abdullahpur Flyover
 Jhal Khanuwal Flyover
 Mall Road
 Station Road
 M.A. Jinnah Road
 Railway Road
 Rajbah Road
 Club Road
 Liaqat Road
 Circular Road
 Bilal Road
 Jail Road
 Millat Road
 Punj Pullian Road
 Sargodha Road
 Narwala Road
 Dijkot Road
 Baqar Mandi Road
 Kotwali Road
 Jhang Road
 Eid Gah Road
 Lower Canal Road

Local roads 

Local roads in and around the city are not regulated by the city traffic police. They are less maintained and traffic patterns are quite unpredictable. The condition of the roads varies hugely depending on the area.

Rail 
The Faisalabad railway station is the central railway station in the city. The railway line forms part of the Khanewal–Wazirabad railway line. Rail services are operated by Pakistan Railways, owned and operated by the Ministry of Railways.

Cargo Express services are operated by Pakistan Railways which runs from Karachi to Faisalabad via Multan. Twenty-seven bogies compose the goods train, and are handled respectively by private contractors at the station. The station has a special cargo facility operated by the Ministry of Railways (Pakistan) for handling various goods from the city to other regions of the country.  An express parcel service runs from Karachi to Lahore via Faisalabad.

See also 
 List of people from Faisalabad
 Faisalabad District
 Faisalabad Electric Supply Company

References

External links 

 Faisalabad City District
 Punjab Government website
 
 

 
Cities and towns in Faisalabad District
Metropolitan areas of Pakistan
Planned cities in Pakistan
Populated places in Punjab, Pakistan
Cities in Punjab (Pakistan)
Populated places established in 1892